Jessica Rose Epel Alupo, commonly known as Jessica Alupo, is the ninth and current vice president of Uganda since 2021. She is a Ugandan politician, educator, and former military officer. She previously served in the cabinet of Uganda as minister of education between 2011 and 2016. She is also an elected member of parliament as Katakwi District's women's representative.

Background and education
She was born in Katakwi District on 23 May 1974. She attended Apuuton Katakwi Primary School. She then attended Kangole Girls School for her O-Level studies. For her A-Level education, she studied at Ngora High School. Alupo trained as a high school canteen attendant before she underwent the officer cadet course at the Uganda Junior Staff College in Jinja. She holds a Bachelor of Arts in political science and linguistics, obtained in 1997 from Makerere University. Her first master's degree, the Master of Arts in international relations and diplomacy, was also obtained from Makerere University in 2008. She also holds a Diploma in public administration and management, obtained in 2008 from the Uganda Management Institute (UMI). Her second master's degree is the Masters in public administration and management, obtained in 2009, also from Makerere University.

Work experience
Over the years, she has been employed in various capacities including:
 As a teacher at the Katakwi High School in the town of Katakwi, Katakwi District, Eastern Region of Uganda
 As an instructor at the Uganda Urban Warfare Training School, Singo, Nakaseke District, Central Region of Uganda
 As an intelligence officer at the Chieftaincy of Military Intelligence, in Kampala, Uganda's capital city.

In 2001, she entered politics as a candidate for the Katakwi District women's representative. She ran on the ticket of the National Resistance Movement (NRM) political party. She won and was re-elected in 2006. In 2009, she was appointed as state minister for youth and children affairs. In 2011, she was re-elected to her parliamentary constituency. In the cabinet reshuffle of 27 May 2011, she was promoted to the post of minister of education and sports. She replaced Namirembe Bitamazire, who was dropped from the cabinet.

Personal life
Alupo is married to Innocent Tukashaba. She is reported to enjoy reading, community mobilization, and travel.

References

External links
 Website of the Parliament of Uganda
Website of Uganda Ministry of Education And Sports

1974 births
Living people
21st-century Ugandan women politicians
21st-century Ugandan politicians
Government ministers of Uganda
Independent politicians in Uganda
Itesot people
Makerere University alumni
Members of the Parliament of Uganda
People from Eastern Region, Uganda
People from Katakwi District
People from Teso sub-region
Uganda Management Institute alumni
Ugandan military personnel
Vice presidents of Uganda
Women government ministers of Uganda
Women members of the Parliament of Uganda
Women vice presidents